Aechmea brevicollis is a plant species in the genus Aechmea. It is native to Colombia, Venezuela, and northern Brazil.

Cultivars
 Aechmea 'Jack'
 Aechmea 'Orange Sherbert'

References

brevicollis
Flora of South America
Plants described in 1945